Ain Zhalta (Arabic: عين زحلتا) is a village in the Chouf District of Mount Lebanon Governorate in southwestern Lebanon.

The Battle of Ain Zhalta was held here in June 1982 with Syria.

Masser Al-Chouf, Barouk, and Ain Zhalta–Bmohary form a biosphere reserve, protected by UNESCO in June 2005.

Notable people
 Cyril IX Moghabghab (1855–1947), Patriarch of the Melkite Greek Catholic Church from 1925 to 1947.
 Naim Moghabghab (1918-1959), Member of Parliament (1953- Reelected 1957), Minister of Public Works. (1955-1956): Renovated & paved all roads in Mount Lebanon; Pumped water to all villages including Aley & Bhamdoon; & helped rebuild houses that had earth roofs. He looked after the welfare of all citizens of all faiths & never asked to be repaid.

References

External links
 Ain Zhalta, Localiban

Populated places in Chouf District
Melkite Christian communities in Lebanon